Life Is...Too Short (stylized as Life Is... Too $hort) is the fifth studio album by American rapper Too Short. It was released in 1989 through Jive Records and RCA Records, although it appeared as a Dangerous Music/RCA Records release until Jive Records logos appeared on the release on October 25, 1990, after it became successful. It is currently his highest-selling album to date, being certified double platinum by the RIAA for sales of over 2 million copies.

Critical Reception
In 2022, Rolling Stone included Life Is... Too Short in their list of The 200 Greatest Hip-Hop Albums of All Time at 186.

Track listing

Personnel
T. Bohanon - Producer
Al Eaton - Guitar, Keyboards, Producer, Mixing
Victor Hall - Photography
Helen Kim - Vocals (background)
Mr. Z - Clothing/Wardrobe
Todd Shaw - Keyboards, Programming, Producer, Drum Programming, Mixing
Janna Thomas - Vocals (background)
Mark  - Artwork
Jeanette Wright - Vocals (background)
Rappin' 4-Tay - Performer

Charts

Weekly charts

Year-end charts

Certifications

References

Too Short albums
1989 albums
Jive Records albums